18 binary digits have  (1000000 octal, 40000 hexadecimal) distinct combinations.

18 bits was a common word size for smaller computers in the 1960s, when large computers often used 36 bit words and 6-bit character sets, sometimes implemented as extensions of BCD, were the norm. There were also 18-bit teletypes experimented with in the 1940s.

Example computer architectures
Possibly the most well-known 18-bit computer architectures are the PDP-1, PDP-4, PDP-7, PDP-9 and PDP-15 minicomputers produced by Digital Equipment Corporation from 1960 to 1975. Digital's PDP-10 used 36-bit words but had 18-bit addresses.

The UNIVAC produced several 18-bit computers, including the UNIVAC 418 and several military systems.

The IBM 7700 Data Acquisition System was announced by IBM on December 2, 1963.

The BCL Molecular 18 was a group of systems designed and manufactured in the UK in the 1970s and 1980s.

The NASA Standard Spacecraft Computer NSSC-1 was developed as a standard component for the MultiMission Modular Spacecraft at the Goddard Space Flight Center (GSFC) in 1974.

The flying-spot store digital memory in the first experimental electronic switching systems used nine plates of optical memory that were read and written two bits at a time, producing a word size of 18 bits.

Character encoding
18-bit machines use a variety of character encodings.

The DEC Radix-50, called Radix 508 format, packs three characters plus two bits in each 18-bit word.

The Teletype packs three characters in each 18-bit word; each character a 5-bit Baudot code and an upper-case bit.

The DEC SIXBIT format packs three characters in each 18-bit word, each 6-bit character obtained by stripping the high bits from the 7-bit ASCII code, which folds lowercase to uppercase letters.

References

 DIGITAL Computing Timelime: 18-bit architecture
 Architectural Evolution in DEC’s 18b Computers, Bob Supnik, 2006.

Computer data